Brandon Brooks (born August 19, 1989) is a former American football guard who played in the National Football League (NFL) for 10 seasons with the Houston Texans and Philadelphia Eagles. He played college football at Miami (OH) and was drafted in the third round by the Texans in the 2012 NFL Draft.

He played four seasons with the Texans, including three as a starter. In 2016, he joined the Philadelphia Eagles in free agency. He played for six seasons with the team, winning Super Bowl LII and making three consecutive Pro Bowls from 2017 to 2019 in the process. He retired after missing 31 combined regular season games over the next two seasons due to injuries.

High school
Brooks helped captain the Riverside University High School Tigers to an 11-2 record, a city championship and an appearance in the 2006 state semifinals and he was named all-state in 2006. He also played baseball and basketball.

College
A four-year starter at Miami, Brooks was named second-team All-MAC (Mid-American Conference) for each of the 2009, 2010 and 2011 seasons, the last of which the RedHawks went 10-4 overall, winning the MAC championship and a postseason bowl game. He earned a bachelor's degree in psychology.

Professional career

Houston Texans
In his rookie season, Brooks was inactive for the first 10 games before being used as a reserve for the final six games as well as two playoff games. In the 2013 season, he became a starter and remained there throughout his time with the Texans.

Philadelphia Eagles
On March 9, 2016, Brooks signed a five-year, $40 million contract with the Philadelphia Eagles. He started 14 games at right guard in his first year in Philadelphia.

On December 19, 2017, Brooks was named to his first Pro Bowl along with right tackle Lane Johnson after starting all 16 games at right guard. He could not play in the Pro Bowl because of his team advancing to the Super Bowl. Brooks would win his first Super Bowl when the Eagles defeated the New England Patriots in Super Bowl LII by a score of 41–33.
 
On December 17, 2018, Brooks was named to his second Pro Bowl. That season the Philadelphia Eagles went 9–7 and earned a wildcard spot. They defeated the Chicago Bears 16–15 in the wildcard round, then lost 20–14 to the New Orleans Saints in the divisional round. The loss was costly for Brooks, as he suffered a torn Achilles. He was able to return for the 2019 season, as he also incorporated Kung fu in his off-field training.

Brooks signed a four-year, $54.2 million contract extension through the 2024 season with the Eagles on November 11, 2019. He was named to his third straight Pro Bowl on December 17, 2019.

On December 29, 2019, Brooks suffered a dislocated shoulder in the last regular season game against the New York Giants, forcing him to miss the postseason. He was ranked 98th by his fellow players on the NFL Top 100 Players of 2020.

On June 15, 2020, it was announced that Brooks tore his Achilles and would miss the upcoming 2020 season. He was placed on the active/physically unable to perform list at the start of training camp on August 4, 2020, and placed on reserve/PUP at the start of the regular season on September 5. He began practicing with the team again on December 30, but the team did not activate him before the end of the season.

In Week 2 of the 2021 season, Brooks suffered a pectoral strain and was placed on injured reserve on September 21, 2021.

On January 26, 2022, Brooks announced his retirement from the NFL.

Personal life 
Brooks was diagnosed with a stress-related anxiety disorder in 2016, which explained his vomit bouts only on game days, even after a stomach ulcer was treated. He is also a Jiu-Jitsu practitioner.

He was the spring 2018 commencement speaker at his alma mater, Miami University. 

Brooks currently resides in Medford, New Jersey. He is currently pursuing an MBA at the Wharton School at the University of Pennsylvania.

References

External links
 
 Miami RedHawks bio
 Houston Texans bio
 Philadelphia Eagles bio
 

1989 births
Living people
Players of American football from Milwaukee
American football offensive guards
American football offensive tackles
Miami RedHawks football players
Houston Texans players
Philadelphia Eagles players
National Conference Pro Bowl players
People from Medford, New Jersey
American Wing Chun practitioners
Ed Block Courage Award recipients